The Eric Lindros trade was the culmination of a holdout by Eric Lindros from the Quebec Nordiques of the National Hockey League (NHL). The Nordiques selected Lindros in the 1991 NHL Entry Draft with the first overall selection, but Lindros refused to play for them. After holding out from Quebec for a year, the Nordiques agreed to two trades involving Lindros at the onset of the 1992 NHL Entry Draft, one with the Philadelphia Flyers and one with the New York Rangers. An arbitrator ruled in favour of the Flyers on June 30, 1992.

Lindros played for the Flyers until 2001. He was awarded the Hart Memorial Trophy as the league's Most Valuable Player in 1995; however, the Flyers never won the Stanley Cup with Lindros, only ever reaching the Stanley Cup Finals in 1997. The Nordiques, who moved to Denver, Colorado, and became the Colorado Avalanche, won the Stanley Cup in 1996 and 2001 with contributions from players acquired in the Lindros trade, including Peter Forsberg and Mike Ricci. The Rangers also won the 1994 Stanley Cup with some of the players that they originally offered in exchange for Lindros, including Alexei Kovalev and Mike Richter. Lindros himself, however, retired having never hoisted the Cup.

Background
As an amateur, Lindros played junior ice hockey for the Oshawa Generals of the Ontario Hockey League (OHL). He had been selected by the Sault Ste. Marie Greyhounds of the OHL, but he refused to play for them, and was traded to Oshawa. This led to a rule change that allowed players to play closer to their home. He led the Generals to the Memorial Cup in 1990, and won the Red Tilson Trophy, given to the Most Outstanding Player in the OHL, in 1991. That year, he was named the Canadian Hockey League (CHL) Player of the Year and won the CHL Top Draft Prospect Award. Lindros was considered the best prospect available in the 1991 NHL Entry Draft, and received the nickname "The Next One", as a possible successor to Wayne Gretzky, known as "The Great One".

The Quebec Nordiques, who won 26 games combined in the 1989–90 and 1990–91 seasons, held the first overall selection in the draft for the third consecutive year. They had selected Mats Sundin and Owen Nolan in the previous two drafts, and also had rising star Joe Sakic. However, Lindros stated before the draft that he would hold out and refuse to play for Quebec. It was widely speculated that Lindros wanted to play in an English-speaking area that would present him with more endorsement opportunities, although Lindros himself insisted later that he was motivated solely by antipathy toward Nordiques owner Marcel Aubut.

The Nordiques selected Lindros despite the warning. He asked for a $3 million annual salary with the hopes that Quebec would trade him. Rather than sign with Quebec, he returned to Oshawa for the 1991–92 season and represented Canada in the 1992 Winter Olympics. Meanwhile, Lindros reportedly rejected a 10-year contract offer worth at least $50 million from the Nordiques in March 1992, although, Quebec denied making the offer. Gord Kirke acted as legal counsel to Lindros during this time, and led contract negotiations. Kirke later stated about the incident that, "There were all kinds of allegations of Eric being anti-Quebec. But I knew it to be absolutely false. It had more to do with the management of the team".

By June 1992, the Nordiques announced that they were moving towards trading Lindros, and were engaged in trade discussions with the Toronto Maple Leafs, Calgary Flames, New Jersey Devils, Philadelphia Flyers, and Detroit Red Wings. The Red Wings were reported to be willing to trade Steve Yzerman, Steve Chiasson, and numerous draft picks to the Nordiques for Lindros. Yzerman indicated that he would also hold out from the Nordiques, should Detroit trade him to Quebec.

Competing trades
On June 20, 1992, at the onset of the 1992 NHL Entry Draft, the Nordiques entered into a verbal agreement on a trade involving Lindros with the Flyers. The trade was contingent on Lindros agreeing to play in Philadelphia. The Nordiques permitted Russ Farwell, the general manager of the Flyers, to call Lindros to discuss whether or not Lindros would be willing to play for the Flyers, and he received assurance that Lindros considered Philadelphia to be acceptable. Within 80 minutes of agreeing to a trade with Farwell, Marcel Aubut, the president of the Nordiques, had second thoughts about the trade with Philadelphia and verbally agreed to trade Lindros to the New York Rangers. The Flyers offer was reported to include Mike Ricci, Rod Brind'Amour, Mark Recchi, Steve Duchesne, Ron Hextall, Dominic Roussel, multiple first-round draft picks, and $15 million, while the Rangers had reportedly agreed to trade Sergei Nemchinov, Tony Amonte, Alexei Kovalev, James Patrick, and either John Vanbiesbrouck or Mike Richter, as well as multiple first-round draft picks and $20 million.

The Flyers claimed that the Nordiques had reneged on their agreement, and filed a complaint with the NHL. The NHL appointed Larry Bertuzzi, a lawyer from Toronto, as the arbitrator of the conflict. Bertuzzi held a five-day hearing after the 1992 draft, in which he reviewed over 400 pages of handwritten notes and called 11 witnesses, including Lindros.

On June 30, Bertuzzi announced that he had determined that Quebec's agreement with the Flyers was enforceable. He considered Farwell's phone call with Lindros to be "critical" in making his decision. Bertuzzi also found the Rangers to be innocent of any wrongdoing. The finalized trade had the Nordiques acquire Hextall, Duchesne, Ricci, Kerry Huffman, Peter Forsberg, a first-round pick in the 1993 NHL Entry Draft, $15 million, and future considerations. As the agreed-upon trade included the Flyers sending a 1992 draft pick to Quebec which Philadelphia instead kept because the trade was not yet finalized, Bertuzzi helped the teams agree that the Flyers would send Chris Simon and a pick in the 1994 NHL Entry Draft to Quebec to compensate for the 1992 draft pick that the Flyers kept and used to select Ryan Sittler. The Nordiques selected Jocelyn Thibault with the 1993 draft pick (10th overall pick), while they swapped 1994 first-round picks with Toronto Maple Leafs as part of a larger 6-player trade, with Quebec drafting Jeff Kealty 22nd overall with the pick from Toronto, while Toronto traded the original Philadelphia pick to the Washington Capitals, who selected Nolan Baumgartner 10th overall in 1994.

Aftermath

Gil Stein, president of the NHL, indicated that the league would not take disciplinary action against Aubut, and the Rangers did not challenge the arbitrator's decision. Stein further stated that as of August 1, all trades needed to be confirmed with the league office by all involved parties before they would be considered consummated. Lindros signed a five-year contract with the Flyers worth an estimated $24 million. As a rookie, he earned $2 million, while Gretzky, with the largest NHL contract, earned $3 million. Lindros did not accompany the Flyers to Quebec for an exhibition game prior to the 1992–93 season due to concern about the reception he would receive. Hextall and Ricci initially did not want to report to Quebec, but relented.

The Nordiques reached the playoffs in the 1992–93 season, their first postseason appearance since 1987. In 1995, the Nordiques moved to Denver, Colorado, and became the Colorado Avalanche. The Avalanche won the 1996 Stanley Cup Finals with Forsberg and Ricci playing key roles for the team. Thibault was traded to the Montreal Canadiens for Patrick Roy, who was their starting goaltender as Stanley Cup champions, while Hextall was traded to the New York Islanders in a trade that netted Adam Deadmarsh.

The Avalanche also won the 2001 Stanley Cup Finals with Forsberg and Roy playing key roles, as well as Alex Tanguay, who had been drafted with a pick acquired in exchange for Ricci from the San Jose Sharks. Deadmarsh was traded to the Los Angeles Kings on February 21, 2001, as part of multi-player deal for Colorado to upgrade their team with Rob Blake and Steve Reinprecht prior to the playoffs.

Meanwhile, the Rangers won the 1994 Stanley Cup Finals anyway without Lindros. Among the players that the Rangers had originally offered in 1992 for Lindros, Kovalev and Richter played key roles in their 1994 Cup run.

Playing as a centre, Lindros formed a forward line with wingers Recchi and Brent Fedyk in 1992, called the "Crazy Eights". After the Flyers traded Recchi to acquire John LeClair in 1995, Lindros, LeClair, and Mikael Renberg played together as the "Legion of Doom". The Flyers did not win a Stanley Cup with Lindros; they reached the 1997 Stanley Cup Finals, but lost. Lindros did win the Hart Memorial Trophy as a member of the Flyers. Lindros' arrival in Philadelphia helped the team secure funding for their new arena, the Wells Fargo Center, and a lucrative television contract with Comcast SportsNet Philadelphia.

Bobby Clarke, who succeeded Farwell as the general manager of the Flyers, feuded with Lindros and his parents during his time with Philadelphia. Lindros sat out the entire 2000–01 NHL season after rejecting a one-year, $8.5 million offer as he demanded a trade from the Flyers. The Flyers traded him to the Rangers in 2001. After Lindros retired from the NHL, the Flyers inducted him into their team Hall of Fame in 2014.

List of Quebec/Colorado's subsequent transactions

Players on the NY Rangers's voided offer that stayed for their 1994 championship run
 Alexei Kovalev
 Sergei Nemchinov
 Mike Richter

End result at the end of the 2000–01 season

See also

 Flyers–Rangers rivalry
 Herschel Walker trade
 Brock for Broglio
 White Flag Trade
 Ricky Williams trade
 List of largest National Football League trades

References

Philadelphia Flyers
Quebec Nordiques
New York Rangers
1992–93 NHL season
National Hockey League history
Sports trades